Evertek may refer to:

Businesses 
 Evertek Computer Corporation, US Consumer Wholesaler (owner of US trademark "evertek")
 EvertekTunisie, Tunisian brand of cell phone - part of Cellcom Tunisie
 Evertek, Inc., an Iowa (US) telecommunication company
 Evertec, Inc., a Puerto Rican electronic transaction processing company.